Radio Ixtlan is the fourth studio album by the English musical project Ewigkeit. It is a concept album based on the concept of the journey of the soul, examining psychological, parapsychological and mythological themes.

Track listing
About Time ( – 02:45)
Esc. ( – 03:26)	
PowerPlant ( – 04:27)	
Journey to IXTLAN ( – 09:12)	
Live at Palenque 2012 ( – 02:22)	
Conquer the Fear ( – 03:49)	
Platonic Verses ( – 03:16)	
Strange Volk ( – 04:43)	
The New Way ( – 05:00)

2004 albums
Ewigkeit albums
Earache Records albums